Emiliano Zapata is a municipality in the Mexican state of Chiapas, located approximately  southeast of the state capital of Tuxtla Gutiérrez.

Geography
The municipality of Emiliano Zapata is located in the Chiapas Depression. It borders the municipalities of Acala to the east, Venustiano Carranza to the southeast, and Chiapa de Corzo to the west.

The rolling terrain of Emiliano Zapata is mostly covered by farmland and pastureland with isolated patches of jungle. The Grijalva River forms the northern and southeastern border of the municipality, and the Angostura Dam (officially called the Belisario Domínguez Dam) on that river is located on the border between Emiliano Zapata and Venustiano Carranza.

History
On 23 November 2011, the government of Chiapas decreed the creation of the municipalities of Belisario Domínguez, El Parral, Emiliano Zapata, and Mezcalapa. Emiliano Zapata was created from the ejido of 20 de Noviembre which was formerly part of the municipality of Acala.

Administration
The following people have served as municipal president of Emiliano Zapata:

Sergio Avid Ruiz Llaven, 2012–2015
Uber Gamboa Escobar, 2015–2018
Amador Moreno Ruiz, 2018–2021

Demographics
In the 2010 Mexican Census, the localities that now comprise the municipality of Emiliano Zapata recorded a total population of 9915 inhabitants.

There are 142 localities in the municipality, of which only the municipal seat 20 de Noviembre is designated as urban. It recorded a population of 4636 inhabitants in the 2010 Census.

Infrastructure
A paved spur route of Mexican Federal Highway 190 runs from Chiapa de Corzo northwest to southeast through the municipality, crossing over the Grijalva River on the Angostura Dam into Venustiano Carranza.

References

Municipalities of Chiapas
2011 establishments in Mexico
States and territories established in 2011